= Similocorus =

Scientific classification
- Kingdom: Animalia
- Phylum: Arthropoda
- Class: Insecta
- Order: Coleoptera
- Suborder: Polyphaga
- Infraorder: Cucujiformia
- Family: Cerambycidae
- Genus: Similocorus
- Species: S. negrosensis

Binomial name
- Similocorus negrosensis (Breuning, 1970)

Species of beetle

Similocorus negrosensis is a species of beetle in the family Cerambycidae, and the only species in the genus Similocorus. It was described by Breuning in 1970.
